Suresh Ramrao Jadhav is an Indian politician. He was elected to the Lok Sabha, lower house of the Parliament of India from Parbhani, Maharashtra as a member of the Shiv Sena.

References

India MPs 1996–1997
Shiv Sena politicians
Lok Sabha members from Maharashtra
India MPs 1999–2004
1958 births
Living people
Marathi politicians
People from Parbhani district